Bogaczów may refer to:

Bogaczów, Lower Silesian Voivodeship (south-west Poland)
Bogaczów, Zielona Góra County in Lubusz Voivodeship (west Poland)
Bogaczów, Żary County in Lubusz Voivodeship (west Poland)